Finland competed at the 1928 Summer Olympics in Amsterdam, Netherlands. 69 competitors (67 men and 2 women) took part in 48 events in 11 sports.

Medalists

Aquatics

Diving

Two divers, a man and a woman, represented Finland in 1928. It was the nation's fifth appearance in the sport as well as the Games. Both divers competed in the platform events. Onnela advanced to the final, finishing 5th; this matched the best result for a Finnish diver to date. Lampila came in 4th in his preliminary group, just outside the top 3 required to advance.

Swimming

One swimmer, Disa Lindberg, represented Finland in 1928. It was the nation's 5th appearance in swimming as well as the Games, and the first time since 1912 Finland had sent a female swimmer. Lindberg competed in the 400 metre freestyle, placing 4th in her heat and not advancing to the semifinals.

Athletics

Men
Track & road events

Field events

Combined events – Decathlon

Boxing

Three boxers represented Finland in 1928. The sport was open to men only. It was the nation's first time competing in Olympic boxing. Two boxers, Hellström and Väkevä, advanced to the quarterfinals before being defeated; each had a first-round bye and won his second-round match. The third, Resko, did not have a bye and lost his first-round bout.

Cycling

One male cyclist represented Finland in 1928. It was the nation's third appearance in the sport. Hellberg finished 10th place in the road race.

Road cycling

Equestrian

A single equestrian represented Finland in 1928. It was the nation's 3rd appearance in the sport. Von Essen placed 5th in the individual eventing, improving on Finland's best equestrian result.

Eventing

Fencing

Two fencers, both men, represented Finland in 1928. It was the nation's debut appearance in the sport.

Gymnastics

Eight gymnasts, all men, represented Finland in 1928. It was the nation's 4th appearance in the sport. Nyberg-Noroma and Savolainen tied for 6th in the all-around, Finland's best individual all-around results to that point. Savolainen won a bronze medal in the pommel horse apparatus. Finland finished 5th in the team all-around.

Artistic gymnastics

Modern pentathlon

Three pentathletes, all men, represented Finland in 1928. It was the nation's 3rd appearance in the sport.

Sailing

One sailor represented Finland in 1928. It was the nation's 3rd appearance in the sport. Broman won the bronze medal in the 12' dinghy class, finishing 1st in two of the first four races to tie Sweden's Sven Thorell and Norway's Henrik Robert for the lead after the preliminary round (using the final round scoring system, rather than the preliminary round's point-for-place system). The other two men each won at least one of the final four races, however, and Broman did not; his two 2nd-place finishes kept him ahead of Willem de Vries Lentsch of the Netherlands.

 Dinghy

Wrestling

In the first year that wrestling was limited to 1 competitor per NOC per event, Finland sent 13 wrestlers—one in each event. The sport was open to men only. It was the nation's 5th appearance in the sport as well as the Games. Finland continued its strong performance in wrestling, topping the medal table for the 4th straight Olympics. Finland matched Sweden for most gold medals at 3 and more than doubled Sweden and Germany in total medals, 9 to 4.

Freestyle wrestling

The Finnish freestyle wrestling team had numerous Olympic veterans. Haavisto, who had taken bronze in lightweight in 1924, won gold at welterweight this time. Mäkinen, a third-time Olympian, also improved upon his 1924 medal (silver) with a gold medal in 1928. Pihlajamäki was unable to defend his 1924 gold, moving up in weight class from bantam to featherweight and moving down in medal from gold to silver. Leino received his third medal: gold in 1920, silver in 1924, and now bronze in 1928. The 1924 middleweight bronze medalist Pekkala reached the semifinals, but ultimately finished 7th because the man he lost to did not medal.

The wrestlers in the two heaviest weight classes were new Olympians. Rosenqvist lost in the first round and placed 6th in the light heavyweight. Sihvola also lost in the first round, but because his opponent went on to win the gold medal, Sihvola wrestled in—and won—the silver medal tournament.

Greco-Roman wrestling

Kokkinen completed the rare feat of earning zero bad points throughout the competition, winning all 5 of his bouts by fall to earn the gold medal. Nyström took a silver medal, falling to the eventual gold medalist in the first round but managing to keep his bad points under 5 until the last round. Two veterans, Pellinen (bronze in 1924) and Westerlund (gold in 1924) earned bronze medals. Two others, Ahlfors and Toivola (each silver medalists in 1924) were unable to earn medals.

References

External links
Official Olympic Reports
International Olympic Committee results database

Nations at the 1928 Summer Olympics
1928
1928 in Finnish sport